The Triple J Hottest 100 of All Time was a music poll conducted in 2009 amongst listeners of Australian youth radio network Triple J. Over half a million votes were compiled, with Nirvana's "Smells Like Teen Spirit" collecting the highest number of votes. Voters could submit a list of up to ten different songs as well as nominating one of these as their "all-time" favourite song. It was the fifth such poll organised by Triple J, following similar polls in 1989, 1990, 1991 and 1998. Initially, all songs were eligible for the annual Triple J Hottest 100. However, from 1993 onward (after having no list in 1992), only songs released in the previous year were permitted. Thus, the Hottest 100 of All Time is conducted via a separate vote, held irregularly to reflect listeners' favourite songs across all eras. The 2009 list was designed to reflect the twentieth anniversary of the Hottest 100's inception. The Triple J Hottest 100 of all time was broadcast over two nights on ABC TV's music show Rage. However, certain songs were omitted from the broadcast because they were never made into music videos.

Full list

Bold: Previous winner of a standard Hottest 100
Green background: Australian artists

Artists with multiple entries

Five Tracks
Dave Grohl (1, 40, 74 with Nirvana, 9 with Foo Fighters and 45 with Queens of the Stone Age)

Four Tracks
Jeff Buckley (3, 7, 56, 69)
John Lennon (24, 44, 86 with The Beatles, 11 as a solo artist)
Radiohead (5, 13, 15, 28)

Three Tracks
Nirvana (1, 40, 74)
The Beatles  (24, 44, 86)
The Smashing Pumpkins (35, 51, 78)

Two Tracks
AC/DC (63, 91)
Daft Punk (58, 96)
Led Zeppelin (10, 98)
Massive Attack (22, 93)
Metallica (19, 31)
Michael Jackson (26, 41)
Pearl Jam  (25, 39)
Pink Floyd (16, 53)
Powderfinger (21, 27)
Rage Against the Machine (2, 89)
The Rolling Stones (80, 88)
Tool (37, 57)

Trivia
 News of Michael Jackson's death surfaced during the final week of voting. Triple J announcers pointed out that both "Thriller" and "Billie Jean" were already polling enough votes to feature in the top 100, but that the final week of voting pushed both songs further up the list.
 This is the first Hottest 100 Of All Time where The Cure did not achieve more than one track.
 This is the first Hottest 100 Of All Time where R.E.M. did not achieve any tracks. In all other years, they had achieved at least two.
 Only one vote separated No One Knows by Queens of the Stone Age from Hey Jude by The Beatles.
 Radiohead swapped the #5 and #13 positions they had held in the 1998 all time countdown with "Creep" and "Paranoid Android".
 Franz Ferdinand is the second band behind Powderfinger to come 1st and 100th in a Hottest 100. Take Me Out is also the first song in the Hottest 100 to have reached both ends of the countdown.
 This is the first Of All Time countdown to not feature any songs from the year of the countdown.
 This countdown also is the first to not feature any Australian artists in the Top 10.
 It was announced at the beginning of the countdown that the 101st song was Heart Shaped Box by Nirvana.
 Only two songs in the entire Hottest 100 featured a female lead vocalist: Shara Nelson and Elizabeth Fraser, both of whom were guest vocalists on songs by Massive Attack ("Unfinished Sympathy" and "Teardrop" respectively). As such, there were no female artists or bands with permanent female vocalists who reached the countdown.
 Overall, six bands with songs on the countdown included female instrumentalists. These were The Dandy Warhols, New Order, Pixies, Pulp, The Smashing Pumpkins and The White Stripes, accounting for eight songs between them, the only other songs which featured contributions from a female musician were "Wolf Like Me" by TV on the Radio, which featured backing vocals from musician Katrina Ford, and "Gimme Shelter" by The Rolling Stones, which featured backing vocals from singer Merry Clayton.

CD release
Triple J released a compilation disc including 36 of the tracks.

DVD
 Paranoid Android - Radiohead.
 Killing In The Name - Rage Against The Machine.
 Knights Of Cydonia - Muse.
 Hallelujah - Jeff Buckley.
 Love Will Tear Us Apart - Joy Division.
 Wonderwall - Oasis.
 The Nosebleed Section - Hilltop Hoods.
 Seven Nation Army - The White Stripes.
 Teardrop - Massive Attack.
 My Happiness - Powderfinger.
 Throw Your Arms Around Me - Hunters And Collectors.
 Blue Monday - New Order.
 Mr. Brightside - The Killers.
 Prisoner Of Society - The Living End.
 Tomorrow - Silverchair.
 Into My Arms - Nick Cave And The Bad Seeds.
 Banquet - Bloc Party.
 Epic - Faith No More.
 Berlin Chair - You Am I.
 Betterman - The John Butler Trio.
 Close To Me - The Cure.
 One Crowded Hour - Augie March.
 Blister In The Sun - Violent Femmes.
 Dammit - Blink-182.
 Breathe - The Prodigy.
 Fools Gold - The Stone Roses.
 New Slang - The Shins.
 Brick - Ben Folds Five.
 Hearts A Mess - Gotye.
 Life On Mars? - David Bowie.
 Common People - Pulp.
 Bohemian Like You - The Dandy Warhols.
 Chop Suey! - System Of A Down.
 Float On - Modest Mouse.
 Yellow - Coldplay.
 Wolf Like Me - TV On The Radio.
 Beds Are Burning - Midnight Oil.
 Take Me Out - Franz Ferdinand.
 Fake Plastic Trees - Radiohead.

Countries represented
 United States - 46
 United Kingdom - 36
 Australia - 16
 France - 2 (Both Daft Punk)
 Jamaica - 1 (Bob Marley)

Songs by decade
1960s - 8
1970s - 11
1980s - 15
1990s - 44
2000s - 22

External links 
 Triple J Hottest 100 of all time

2009 in Australian music
Australia Triple J Hottest 100
2009 All Time